Andrew Michael Graham-Dixon (born 26 December 1960) is a British art historian and broadcaster.

Life and career

Early life and education 
Andrew Graham-Dixon is a son of the barrister Anthony Philip Graham-Dixon (1929–2012), Q.C., and (Margaret) Suzanne "Sue" (née Villar, 1931–2010), a publicist for music and opera companies.

Graham-Dixon was educated at the independent Westminster School. He continued his education at Christ Church, Oxford, where he read English. He graduated in 1981 and then pursued doctoral studies at the Courtauld Institute of Art, University of London.

Career 
Graham-Dixon began work as a reviewer for the shortlived weekly The Sunday Correspondent before becoming the chief art critic of The Independent, where he remained until 1998. He won the Arts Journalist of the Year Award three years in a row – in 1987, 1988 and 1989. He later became the chief art critic of The Sunday Telegraph.

In 1992 Graham-Dixon won the first prize in the Reportage section at the Montreal World Film Festival for a documentary film about Théodore Géricault's painting The Raft of the Medusa. From 2004 he was a contributor to The Culture Show on BBC Two, covering a variety of subjects and often acting as the main presenter. He has also presented many BBC documentary series on art, including A History of British Art (1996), Renaissance (1999), Caravaggio (2002), The Secret of Drawing (2005), The Battle for British Art (2007), Art of Eternity (2007), Art of Spain (2008), The Art of Russia (2009), Art of Germany (2010), Art of America (2011), British Art at War: Bomberg, Sickert and Nash (2014),  Art of China (2014) and Art of France (2017). He is passionate about the Mona Lisa, appearing in the popular BBC documentary Secrets of the Mona Lisa (2015). In 2018 he presented a four-part series on BBC Four – Art, Passion & Power: The Story of the Royal Collection.

He has also presented programmes on subjects other than art, such as I, Samurai (2006) and The Real Casino Royale for the BBC and 100% English (2006) for Channel 4. In 2010 he interviewed John Lydon for a Culture Show special about Public Image Ltd.

In 2018 he gave a lecture as part of the Alpine Fellowship symposium in Venice.

Graham-Dixon also wrote and presented the BBC documentary Who Killed Caravaggio?, broadcast on BBC 4 in 2010. The same year saw the publication of his biography, Caravaggio: A Life Sacred And Profane.

Honorary doctorate 
In 2010 Plymouth University awarded Graham-Dixon an honorary Doctorate of Arts.

Supporter of Young British Artists 
He was an early supporter of the group later known as the Young British Artists. In 1990 he wrote:

Goldsmiths' graduates are unembarrassed about promoting themselves and their work: some of the most striking exhibitions in London over the past few months—"The East Country Yard Show", or "Gambler", both staged in docklands—have been independently organised and funded by Goldsmiths' graduates as showcases for their work. This has given them a reputation for pushiness, yet it should also be said that in terms of ambition, attention to display and sheer bravado there has been little to match such shows in the country's established contemporary art institutions. They were far superior, for instance, to any of the contemporary art shows that have been staged by the Liverpool Tate in its own multi-million-pound dockland site.

Cambridge Union speech 
On 9 November 2021 Graham-Dixon was banned from speaking again at the Cambridge Union after "doing a Hitler impression". According to the Campaign Against Antisemitism Graham-Dixon recited part of speech made by Adolf Hitler including the lines: "This modern, horrible art that was promoted by the Jews.. and the modern art, it was cubist – inspired by the art of the negroes. This tribal art, urgh, how horrible is that?"  He later apologised for the impression and claimed that he was trying to "underline the utterly evil nature of Hitler." He added: "I apologise sincerely to anyone who found my debating tactics and use of Hitler's own language distressing; on reflection I can see that some of the words I used, even in quotation, are inherently offensive." Public figures including Louis de Bernières and John Cleese were among those to defend Graham-Dixon, and criticism of the Union's plans for an exclusion list prompted a U-turn from its president.
In a statement to The Jewish Chronicle, fellow historian Guy Walters said: “The idea that Andrew Graham-Dixon has been blacklisted for performing what was clearly a satirical impression of Adolf Hitler is both disgraceful and deeply ironic."
A full transcript of the speech was published by The Telegraph.

Personal life 
Graham-Dixon is married and lives in East Sussex.  He has four children.

Film and television credits

Bibliography 
 Howard Hodgkin. London: Thames & Hudson, 1994; revised, 2001.
 John Virtue: New Paintings. Bristol: Arnolfini, 1995. .
 Paper Museum: Writings About Painting, Mostly. London: HarperCollins, 1996. .
 A History of British Art. London: BBC, 1996. .
 Renaissance. London: BBC, 1999. .
 In the Picture: The Year Through Art. London: Allen Lane, 2002. .
 Michelangelo and the Sistine Chapel. London: Weidenfeld & Nicolson, 2008. .
 Caravaggio: A Life Sacred And Profane. London: Allen Lane, 2009. .

DVD releases 
 Art of Spain (2010)
 Art of Germany (2011)
 Art of China (2015)
 Art of America (2014)
 Italy Unpacked (2014)
 Sicily Unpacked (2014)
 Rome Unpacked (2018)

References

External links 
 
 
 I Never Tell Anybody Anything: The Life and Art of Edward Burra

1960 births
Alumni of Christ Church, Oxford
Alumni of the Courtauld Institute of Art
British art critics
British art historians
Living people
People educated at Westminster School, London